Kalakundi may refer to:
Kalakundi, India, a village in Dharwad district in the southwestern state of Karnataka, India
Kalukundi Mine, a copper and cobalt mine being developed in Katanga Province, Democratic Republic of the Congo (DRC)